Qadam e Rasool (foot-print of Mohammed), situated at
Cuttack, is a shrine and an important specimen of Mughal architecture in Odisha. In the Qadam Rasool
premises are present numerous dargahs, two masjids, namely Moti Masjid and Qadam e Rasool Masjid and several inscriptions.

Researcher Mohammed Yamin said: "Architecturally, it is a beautiful shrine of the Mughal era, but with an Odia style of temple building. Hence, it is a fusion of Hindu-Muslim architecture in Odisha."

Graveyard 
Inside the shrine, there is a big graveyard in which many notable personalities including Shaheed Pani, Atharuddin Mohammed, Mohammad Mohsin, Muhammad Taqi Khan, Sayeed Mohammed, Begum Badar un nissa Akhtar, Afzal-ul Amin, Sikandar Alam, Dr. Hussain Rabi Gandhi are buried. The shrine also has several Persian inscriptions.

References 

Cuttack
Historic sites in India
Mughal architecture
Islamic shrines